COVAX-19 (or SpikoGen) is the result of a collaboration between Vaxine and CinnaGen, a private company with operations in the Middle East. COVAX-19 is a recombinant protein-based COVID-19 vaccine developed by South Australian-based biotech company Vaxine. It is under clinical trial in collaboration with the Iranian company CinnaGen.

Medical uses 
It requires two doses 21 days apart given by intramuscular injection.

Pharmacology 
COVAX-19 is a recombinant protein subunit.

History 
Vaxine began work on a COVID-19 vaccine in January 2020. After developing a number of different types of vaccines, the company decided to focus on a "recombinant protein-based vaccine". A phase 1 human trial started in June 2020. The phase 1 trial involved 40 participants, 30 of whom received the vaccine. The remaining ten participants received a saline placebo.

Phases 2 and 3 clinical trials of COVAX-19 are being conducted in Iran under a co-operation agreement. Phase 2 clinical trials started in May 2021 and Phase 3 trials commenced in August 2021. In the phase 2 trials, 400 Iranian volunteers were injected with either a placebo or the first dose of the vaccine. If the studies are successful, Vaxine will produce the vaccine under the name COVAX-19 in Australia and Cinnagen will produce the vaccine under the name SpikoGen in Iran.

Clinical trials

Authorisations

On 6 October 2021, Iran approved the vaccine for emergency use.

See also 
 COVID-19 vaccine clinical research
 COVID-19 pandemic in Australia
 COVID-19 pandemic in Iran
 Pharmaceuticals in Iran

References 

Clinical trials
Australian COVID-19 vaccines
Iranian COVID-19 vaccines
Protein subunit vaccines